Mount Bethel Baptist Meetinghouse is a historic church in the village of Mount Bethel, Warren Township, Somerset County, New Jersey.

It was built in 1761 on the old Quibbletown Gap Road, then disassembled in 1785 and moved to its present location on King George Road. It was added to the National Register of Historic Places on June 3, 1976.

See also 
 List of the oldest buildings in New Jersey

References

External links
 

Baptist churches in New Jersey
Churches on the National Register of Historic Places in New Jersey
Churches completed in 1761
Churches in Somerset County, New Jersey
National Register of Historic Places in Somerset County, New Jersey
New Jersey Register of Historic Places
18th-century Baptist churches in the United States
Warren Township, New Jersey